Allium prattii is an Asian species of wild onion native to Assam, Nepal, Sikkim, Bhutan, and  China (Anhui, Gansu, Henan, Qinghai, Shaanxi, Sichuan, Tibet, Yunnan). It is found at elevations of 2000–4900 m.

Allium prattii has a scape up to 60 cm tall, round in cross-section. Leaves are flat, linear or very narrowly elliptic, usually a bit shorter than the scape. Umbel is hemispheric with many red or purple flowers.

References

prattii
Onions
Flora of temperate Asia
Plants described in 1903